The New York Mets are an American professional baseball team based in Flushing, Queens, New York City. They compete in the East Division of Major League Baseball's (MLB) National League (NL). The team's current home stadium is Citi Field, after playing two years at the Polo Grounds and 45 years at Shea Stadium. Since their inception in 1962, the Mets have won two World Series titles and five NL championships. As of the end of the 2022 season, the Mets have won more than 4,600 regular season games, a total that ranks 19th among MLB teams and third among expansion teams.

The Mets lost 120 games in their inaugural season, the most by a post-1900 MLB team. After six more years in which their best league finish was ninth, the Mets won the World Series in 1969, defeating the Baltimore Orioles in five games to earn what is widely considered one of the biggest upsets in baseball history. Four seasons later, the Mets returned to the World Series, where they lost to the Oakland Athletics in seven games. After winning two NL championships in five years, New York struggled for the next decade, not coming within 10 games of the NL East leader until 1984.

In 1986, the team posted 108 wins, the most in franchise history, and defeated the Houston Astros in the National League Championship Series (NLCS) to advance to the World Series. Trailing three games to two in the series, the Mets were one out from defeat in game six before coming back to win 6–5; they won game seven two days later to earn their second World Series championship. After a second-place finish in 1987, the Mets won the NL East the next year, but lost to the Los Angeles Dodgers in the NLCS. The Mets' next playoff appearances were their back-to-back wild card-winning seasons of 1999 and 2000; in the latter year, they won their fourth NL championship, but lost to the cross-town New York Yankees in the "Subway Series". The 2006 Mets earned an NL East title, before the St. Louis Cardinals defeated them in the NLCS. In 2007 and 2008, the team was eliminated from playoff contention on the last day of the regular season. The Mets won the NL East in 2015, and swept the Chicago Cubs in four games to win the NLCS and advance to the World Series for the first time since 2000; they lost the Series to the Kansas City Royals in five games. The following year, they returned to the playoffs with a wild card berth, but lost the 2016 NL Wild Card Game to the San Francisco Giants. In the most recent season, 2022, the Mets secured a postseason berth before losing to the San Diego Padres in the NL Wild Card Series.

Table key

Year by year
Note: Statistics are correct as of October 9, 2022.

All-time records

Record by decade 
The following table describes the Mets' MLB win–loss record by decade.

These statistics are from Baseball-Reference.com's New York Mets Team History & Encyclopedia, and are current as of October 9, 2022.

Postseason record by year
The Mets have made the postseason ten times in their history. Their first appearance was in 1969 and the most recent was in 2022.

Notes
This is determined by calculating the difference in wins plus the difference in losses divided by two.
In 1969, the National League split into East and West divisions.
The 1972 Major League Baseball strike forced the cancellation of the Mets' first six games of the season.
Matlack and Bill Madlock were co-winners of the award.
The 1981 Major League Baseball strike caused the season to be split into two halves. The Mets finished with a 17–34 record in the first half of the season, and a fifth-place finish in the National League East. After the strike was resolved, the team had a 24–28 record in the second half, placing them fourth in the division.
The 1994–95 Major League Baseball strike, which started on August 12, led to the cancellation of the rest of the season.
The 1994–95 MLB strike lasted until April 2, causing the 1995 season to be shortened to 144 games.
The Mets finished the 1999 season tied with the Cincinnati Reds for the National League wild card playoff berth. In a one-game tie-breaker, the Mets defeated the Reds 5–0 to win the wild card.
The 2020 season was shortened to 60 games by the COVID-19 pandemic.

References
General

Specific

Major League Baseball teams seasons
Seasons